Anthony Marquez (born November 29, 1968, in Chicago, Illinois) is an American actor and martial artist. Marquez was rated in the North American Sport Karate Association (NASKA) top 10 for 1989, 1990, and 1993. He was also voted for the Rookie of the Year in 1989 by NASKA. Anthony was the NASKA National Chinese Wushu Forms Champion in 1996.

Filmography
Mortal Kombat Mythologies: Sub-Zero (1998) - Wind God/Monk 2 (Fujin)
Spaceman (1997)
Mortal Kombat Trilogy (1996) - Kung Lao
Revolution X (1995) (VG) -  Ninjas
Ultimate Mortal Kombat 3 (1995) (VG) - Kung Lao
Mortal Kombat 3 (1995) (VG) - Kung Lao
Mortal Kombat II (1993) (VG) - Kung Lao

Personal
Marquez currently teaches wushu, sanshou, and mixed martial arts at Extreme KungFu/Wushu Training Center in Chicago.

References

External links

Extreme Kung Fu/Wushu Training Center - Martial Arts in Chicago.

1968 births
Living people
Male actors from Chicago
American male video game actors
American martial artists of Filipino descent